Conduct books or conduct literature is a genre of books that attempt to educate the reader on social norms and ideals.  As a genre, they began in the mid-to-late Middle Ages, although antecedents such as The Maxims of Ptahhotep (c. 2350 BC) are among the earliest surviving works.  Conduct books remained popular through the 18th century, although they gradually declined with the advent of the novel.

Overview
In the introduction to her bibliography of American conduct books published before 1900, Sarah E. Newton defines the conduct book as a text that is intended for an inexperienced young adult or other youthful reader, that defines an ethical, Christian-based code of behavior, and that normally includes gender role definitions. Thus "conduct book" embraces those texts whose primary aim is to describe and define a basically Protestant scheme of life, morals, and behavior, in order to encourage ideal conduct in white, generally middle-class children, young men, or young women. Conduct books do not deal exclusively with questions of etiquette, but rather with the conduct of one's life in a broader, ethical sense. Conduct books are typically addressed to a specific audience but also to society more broadly, and address themes including moral education and gender roles. Their tone may be both admonitory and hortatory, instructing readers both on how to behave and how not to behave.

The critic Nancy Armstrong argues that conduct books "represented a specific configuration of sexual features as those of the only appropriate woman for men at all levels of society to want as a wife", while also providing "people from diverse social groups with a basis for imagining economic interests in common." Armstrong argues that conduct books addressed readers who belonged neither to the aristocracy nor to the working class, thereby paradoxically targeting a middle class audience that did not take shape until a later period—"a middle class that was not actually there."

United States
From the colonial period British and European conduct books were reprinted by American publishers and became popular; until the late 18th and early 19th centuries such imported volumes were the primary source of Americans' behavioral and moral guidance. American conduct books were addressed predominantly to middle-class readers and addressed middle-class concerns. Newton argues that these texts "reflected questions about gentility, right-doing, and manners, but more importantly questions about social identity and roles and how to live good and successful lives." A typical mid-19th-century conduct book for young women would deal with topics including women's responsibilities, domesticity and love of the home, religion, education, courtship and marriage, women's duties to their husbands and children, and "female qualities" such as cheerfulness, humility and submission; while a conduct book for young men of the same period would address themes including ambition, self-reliance, self-improvement, honesty, punctuality, choice of friends and marriage.

In her study of American conduct books published between 1830 and 1860, Jane E. Rose argues that conduct books in this period "glorify Republican Motherhood and domesticity" by characterising the home as the appropriate sphere for women, as a tool for "fostering religion, uprightness, and virtue", and as "women's empire" through which women serve the nation by raising future leaders. Topics covered by conduct books in this period "might include domestic, religious, and wifely duties; advice on health and fashion; rules for dating, mental improvement, and education; the art of conversation and avoiding 'evil-speaking' and gossiping; and advice on fostering harmonious marital relationships." Rose argues that these books, which were aimed predominantly at middle-class white women, placed "certain limitations and restrictions upon women's autonomy, literacy, and educational and vocational opportunities."

Popular 18th-century conduct books included Philip Stanhope, 4th Earl of Chesterfield's Letters to His Son (1774), John Gregory's A Father's Legacy to His Daughters (1774), Hester Chapone's Letters on the Improvement of the Mind (1773), William Kenrick's The Whole Duty of Woman (1753), and the compendium The Lady's Pocket Library (1792), published by Mathew Carey, which included selections by Hannah More, Sarah, Lady Pennington, Anne-Thérèse de Marguenat de Courcelles and Jonathan Swift. In the 19th century, popular conduct books included Henry Ward Beecher's Lectures to Young Men (1844), William Alcott's The Young Man's Guide (1834), The Young Wife, The Young Woman's Guide to Excellence, The Boy's Guide to Usefulness, and Familiar Letters to Young Men on Various Subjects, Lydia Sigourney's Moral Pieces in Prose and Verse (1815), How to Be Happy (1833) and Letters to Young Ladies (1833), Harvey Newcomb's A Practical Directory for Young Christian Females, The Young Lady's Guide to the Harmonious Development of Christian Character, How to Be a Man, Anecdotes for Girls, How to Be a Lady and Anecdotes for Boys, and Timothy Shay Arthur's Advice to Young Ladies on Their Duties and Conduct in Life (1848) and its companion volume Advice to Young Men on Their Duties and Conduct in Life (1848).

Significance
Newton argues that conduct books have promoted political ends; they have aesthetically influenced female characterization and plot development in early American as well as English novels; and they have certainly helped perpetuate traditional American views about female place and roles that emerged, in Barbara Welter's phrase, as the "Cult of True Womanhood."

Armstrong argues that because conduct books appeared to have no political bias, the rules codified in them "took on the power of natural law"; and that as a result "they presented—in actuality, still present—readers with ideology in its most powerful form." Elsewhere Armstrong and Leonard Tennenhouse argue that "Of the means which European culture has developed to create and regulate desire, conduct books for women and certain other form of writing now known as literature offer us the clearest examples", and go on to argue that "the production of specific forms of desire has created and maintained specific forms of political authority".

See also
Courtesy book
Mirrors for princes
Nasîhatnâme
Self-help
Wisdom literature

Notes

References
Literary Encyclopedia: Conduct Book
Review of The Crisis of Courtesy: Studies in the Conduct-Book in Britain, 1600–1900 by Jacques Carre

Publications
A Collection of Conduct Books for Girls and Boys in 19th century America in 5 vols., edited by Toshiko Nonomura. 

Non-fiction genres
Etiquette